"Captain Jack" is a song by the German eurodance group Captain Jack, consisting of singer Franky Gee, actor Shary Durban and singer Liza da Costa. It was released in July 1995, as the lead single from their album The Mission. The song is based on an old army tune known as "Hey, Hey Captain Jack". It was a great success in many countries, particularly in the Netherlands and Hungary, where it topped the chart. It sold to platinum in Germany and gold in the Netherlands and Norway. "Captain Jack" was nominated to the 1997 Echo Awards for the most successful national dance single.

Critical reception
Alan Jones from Music Week wrote, "Captain Jack is a ludicrous creation, already fearsomely popular on the continent. The first Captain Jack single to escape into the UK is a self-titled effort combining a banging techno backing track with some deep-throated singing/rapping. The good captain reels off dance instructions in a frenetic manner which recalls "sounding off" in the style of the US military drill. A bit of a novelty, but one that shouldn't be underestimated."

Chart performance
"Captain Jack" was very successful on the charts in Europe. It peaked at number-one in Hungary and the Netherlands. In the latter, it spent 20 weeks on the Dutch Single Top 100. It managed to climb into the Top 10 also in Austria, Belgium (number 2), Denmark, Germany, Norway and Switzerland. In Belgium, the single was held off reaching the top spot by 2 Fabiola's "Lift U Up". Additionally, it was a Top 20 hit in Ireland, as well as on the Eurochart Hot 100, where it peaked at number 14 in February 1996. In the UK, it only reached number 104 on the UK Singles Chart. "Captain Jack" earned a gold record in the Netherlands and Norway, with a sale of 40,000 and 15,000 singles. In Germany, it was awarded with a platinum record, when 500,000 units were sold there.

Music video
A music video was made for the song. It was directed by Mark Glaeser and filmed in Frankfurt and Turley Barracks in Mannheim, Germany. The video was uploaded to YouTube in March 2010. As of May 2021, it had more than 6 million views.

Track listings

European CD single
"Captain Jack" (Short Mix) – 4:06
"Captain Jack" (Peacecamp Mix) – 5:23

European CD maxi
"Captain Jack" (Short Mix) – 4:06
"Captain Jack" (Peacecamp Mix) – 5:23
"Captain Jack" (House Mix) – 5:04
"Captain Jack" (Club Mix) – 5:19
"Captain Jack" (Analog Mix) – 3:15

European CD maxi (Remixes)
"Captain Jack" (Dancefloor Syndroma Success Mix) – 6:05
"Captain Jack" (Dancefloor Syndroma Radio Remix) – 3:29
"Captain Jack" (Dancefloor Syndroma House Mix) – 6:36
"Captain Jack" (Captain Jack Is In Da House Mix) – 4:28

Charts

Weekly charts

Year-end charts

Certifications

References

1995 songs
1995 singles
Captain Jack (band) songs
Dutch Top 40 number-one singles
Music videos directed by Mark Glaeser